MidFirst Bank is a privately owned financial institution based in Oklahoma City, Oklahoma. It is the largest privately owned bank in the United States, with $34.7 billion in assets. Its primary markets include Oklahoma, Denver, Phoenix and Dallas, with commercial lending offices in Atlanta, Boston, Chicago, Detroit, Houston, Nashville, New York City, Orlando, Salt Lake City, San Antonio, St. Louis and Southern California. MidFirst Bank has banking centers in Boulder and Edwards, Colorado. Additionally, the bank operates 1st Century Bank of Los Angeles as a division of MidFirst Bank and MidFirst Business Credit of Atlanta as a subsidiary of MidFirst Bank.

History
The Midland Group began in 1954 when W.R. Johnston, an Oklahoma banker, purchased a 50% share in Midland Mortgage Company, an Oklahoma City–based company that had been formed four years earlier. Today, family owns 100% of the Midland Group. In 1982, Midland Financial Co. purchased a recently formed charter bank in Stilwell, Oklahoma, and named it MidFirst Bank and moved it to Oklahoma City.

In 2009, MidFirst Bank acquired Community Bank of Arizona and Union Bank, both headquartered in the Phoenix metro area. In 2015, MidFirst Bank acquired Denver-based Steele Street Bank & Trust, a locally owned and operated community bank. In July 2016, MidFirst Bank acquired 1st Century Bancshares in Southern California. After the merger, MidFirst Bank's combined assets totaled more than $12 billion.

The bank offers a full range of commercial, trust, private banking, and mortgage banking products, and it serves as a commercial real estate lender and major servicer of mortgage loans nationally. Primary markets include Oklahoma City, Denver, Phoenix, Tulsa, Dallas, Southern California and western Oklahoma. MidFirst Bank also operates full-service banking centers in Boulder and Edwards, Colorado, and commercial lending offices in Atlanta, Boston, Chicago, Houston, New York City, St. Louis, Orlando, Nashville, Detroit and Southern California.

Community involvement

MidFirst Bank financial education programs have received Honorable Mention recognition from the American Bankers Association Community Commitment Awards in 2016, 2018, and 2020 in the Financial Education category, and in 2020 in the Protecting Older Americans category. Additionally, MidFirst Bank has collaborated with the University of Oklahoma in providing the MoneyCoach financial education program. MidFirst Bank also partners with the True Corps program to serve the community.

In 2019, MidFirst Bank ranked first in the Southwest region for the second consecutive year in the J.D. Power Retail Banking Satisfaction Study, receiving the highest score of all banks in the nation in 2018.

In 2022, MidFirst Bank cause cards benefitting non-profit organizations reached donation milestones. MidFirst Bank customers have donated more than $3 million dollars to breast cancer research through the MidFirst Bank Pink Visa® Debit Card, more than $1.1 million to the American Heart Association through the MidFirst Bank Heart Visa Debit Card, and more than $600,000 to Arts Council Oklahoma City through the MidFirst Bank Art Visa Debit Card. MidFirst’s Pink Visa Debit Card program and the $2 million in donations generated for the OU Health Stephenson Cancer Center were recognized by the Journal Record in 2022 with its Charitable Influence Award.

MidFirst Bank Chairman and CEO G. Jeffrey Records Jr. is a part-owner of the Oklahoma City Thunder of the NBA through its ownership group, Professional Basketball Club.

Awards 

 2022 Charitable Influence Award by Journal Record
 Two-time recipient of “Best-In-State Employer” for Oklahoma
 Nine time winner Best Bank in The Oklahoman Readers’ Choice Awards
 Four time winner Best Online and Mobile Banking in The Oklahoman Readers’ Choice Awards
 Best Mortgage Lender
 Best Bank for CDs
 Four-time winner of Best Big Bank in Oklahoma
 #1 in Southwest region J.D. Power Retail Banking Satisfaction Study

References 

Banks based in Oklahoma
Companies based in Oklahoma City
1982 establishments in Oklahoma
Banks established in 1982
Privately held companies based in Oklahoma